Master W. B. (fl. late 15th century in Mainz) was an anonymous German painter, engraver, and stained glass designer of the late Gothic era. He has been tentatively identified as Wolfgang Beurer, about whom very little is known.

References 
 Schmidt, Hans M.; J. P. Filedt Kok.  "Masters, anonymous, and monogrammists." In Grove Art Online. Oxford Art Online, (accessed January 27, 2012; subscription required).

External links 
 Entry for Wolfgang Beurer on the Union List of Artist Names
 Information about Master W. B. from the Dommuseum Mainz (in German)

15th-century German painters
German engravers
Anonymous artists
15th-century engravers